The Lancastrian War was the third and final phase of the Anglo-French Hundred Years' War. It lasted from 1415, when King Henry V of England invaded Normandy, to 1453, when the English lost Bordeaux. It followed a long period of peace from the end of the Caroline War in 1389. The phase is named after the House of Lancaster, the ruling house of the Kingdom of England, to which Henry V belonged.

The first half of this phase of the war was dominated by the Kingdom of England. Initial English successes, notably at the famous Battle of Agincourt, coupled with divisions among the French ruling class, allowed the English to gain control of large parts of France. In 1420, the Treaty of Troyes was signed, by which the English king married the French princess Catherine and was made regent of the kingdom and heir to the throne of France. A victory on paper was thus achieved by the English, with their claims now having legal standing. Some of the French nobility refused to recognise the agreement, however, and so military subjugation was still necessary to enforce its provisions. King Henry V and, after his death, his brother John, Duke of Bedford, brought the English to the height of their power in France, with an English king crowned in Paris.

The second half of this phase of the war was dominated by the Kingdom of France. French forces counterattacked, inspired by Joan of Arc, La Hire and the Count of Dunois, and aided by the English loss of its main allies, the Dukes of Burgundy and Brittany. Charles VII of France was crowned in Notre-Dame de Reims in 1429, and from then a slow but steady reconquest of English-held French territories ensued. Ultimately the English would be expelled from France and lose all of their continental territories, except the Pale of Calais (which would be re-captured by the French in 1558).

The Battle of Castillon (1453) was the final action of the Hundred Years' War, but France and England remained formally at war until the Treaty of Picquigny in 1475. English, and later British monarchs would continue to nominally claim the French throne until 1801, though they would never again seriously pursue it.

England resumes the war
Henry V of England asserted a claim of inheritance through the female line, with female agency and inheritance recognised in English law but prohibited in France by the Salic law of the Salian Franks.  He thus sought to succeed to the French throne via the claim of his great-grandfather, Edward III of England, through Edward's mother – a claim which the court of France had previously rejected in favour of a more distant but male-line successor, Philip VI.

On his accession in 1413, Henry V pacified the realm by conciliating the remaining enemies of the House of Lancaster, and suppressing the heresy of the Lollards. In 1415, Henry V invaded France and captured Harfleur. Decimated by diseases, Henry's army marched to Calais to withdraw from the French campaign. French forces harassed the English, but refrained from making an open battle while amassing their numbers. The French finally gave battle at Agincourt, which proved to be the third great English victory of the Hundred Years' War, and an overwhelming disaster for the French.

The Armagnac and Burgundian factions of the French court began negotiations to unite against the foreign enemy. Notable leaders of the Armagnac faction, such as Charles, Duke of Orléans, John I, Duke of Bourbon, and Arthur de Richemont (brother of the Duke of Brittany), became prisoners in England. The Burgundians, under John the Fearless, Duke of Burgundy, had conserved their forces, not having fought at Agincourt, but the duke's younger brothers—Anthony, Duke of Brabant and Philip II, Count of Nevers—died at that battle. At a meeting between the Dauphin Charles and John the Fearless, the Duke of Burgundy was assassinated by the Dauphin's followers, forcing the duke's son and successor into an alliance with the English.

Treaty of Troyes
Henry V made a formal alliance with Philip the Good, Duke of Burgundy, who had taken Paris, after the assassination of John the Fearless in 1419. They forced king Charles VI to sign the Treaty of Troyes, by which Henry would marry Charles' daughter Catherine of Valois and Henry and his heirs would inherit the throne of France, disinheriting the Dauphin Charles. Henry formally entered Paris later that year and the agreement was ratified by the Estates-General. Earlier that year an English army under the command of the Earl of Salisbury, ambushed and destroyed a Franco-Scottish force at Fresnay 20 miles north of Le Mans (March 1420).  According to a chronicler, the French and Scottish lost 3,000 men, their camp and its contents including the Scottish treasury. In 1421, an English army of 4,000 was defeated by a Franco-Scottish army of 5,000 at the Battle of Baugé. During the battle Thomas of Lancaster, 1st Duke of Clarence, brother of Henry V, was killed.

Anglo-Burgundian pressure

On his deathbed, Henry V detailed his plans for the war after his death. Henry bade his followers to continue the war until the Treaty of Troyes had been recognised in all of France; the Duke of Burgundy must be offered the regency of France, with Bedford as substitute should he decline; the Burgundian alliance must be preserved at all costs; the Duke of Orléans and some other prisoners must be retained until Henry's son had come of age. There would be no treaty with the Dauphin unless Normandy would be confirmed as an English possession. Bedford adhered to his brother's will, and the Burgundian alliance was preserved as long as he lived.

After Henry's early death in 1422, almost simultaneously with that of his father-in-law, his baby son was crowned King Henry VI of England and II of France. The Armagnacs did not acknowledge Henry and remained loyal to Charles VI's son, the dauphin Charles. The war thus continued in central France.

In 1423, the Earl of Salisbury completely defeated another Franco-Scottish force at Cravant on the banks of the Yonne river. He personally led the crossing of the river, successfully assaulting a very strong enemy position, and in the resulting battle the Scots took very heavy losses. The same year saw a French victory at the Battle of La Brossinière.

The following year, Bedford won what has been described as a "second Agincourt" at Verneuil when his army destroyed a Franco-Scottish army estimated at 16,000 men. This was not a victory of the longbow for advances in plate armour had given armoured cavalry a much greater measure of protection. The heat of August meant the English archers could not implant their stakes, which led to the archers of one flank being swept away. However the English men-at-arms stood firm and waded into their enemy. Assisted by a flank attack from archers from the other wing, they destroyed the allied army. The Scots were surrounded on the field and annihilated, virtually to the last man. Approximately 6500 died there, including all their commanders. As a result, no large-scale Scottish force landed in France again. The French were also subjected to heavy punishment, as their leaders were killed on the field and the rank and file were killed or mostly dispersed.

The following five years witnessed the peak of English power, extending from the Channel to the Loire, excluding only Orléans and Angers, and from Brittany in the west to Burgundy in the east. This was achieved with ever-decreasing resources of man-power.

Joan of Arc

By 1428, the English were laying siege to Orléans, one of the most heavily defended cities in Europe, with more cannons than the French. However one of the French cannons managed to kill the English commander, the Earl of Salisbury. The English force maintained several small fortresses around the city, concentrated in areas where the French could move supplies into the city. In 1429, Joan of Arc convinced the Dauphin to send her to the siege, saying she had received visions from God telling her to drive out the English. She raised the morale of the local troops and they attacked the English redoubts, forcing the English to lift the siege. At the same time, the French king had updated and enhanced his army and took advantage of the lack of common goal between allies.

Inspired by Joan, the French took several English strong points on the Loire and then broke through English archers at Patay commanded by John Fastolf and John Talbot. This victory helped Joan to convince the Dauphin to march to Reims for his coronation as Charles VII.  Although a number of other cities were opened to Charles in the march to Reims and after, Joan never managed to capture Paris, equally well defended as Orléans. She was captured on 23rd May 1430 during the siege of Compiègne by English allies, the Burgundian faction. Joan was transferred to the English, tried by an ecclesiastic court headed by the pro-English Pierre Cauchon, and executed.

Defection of Burgundy
Bedford was the only person that kept Burgundy in the English alliance. Burgundy was not on good terms with Bedford's younger brother, Gloucester. At Bedford's death in 1435, the Burgundians deemed themselves excused from the English alliance, and signed the Treaty of Arras, restoring Paris to Charles VII of France. Their allegiance remained fickle, but the Burgundian focus on expanding their domains into the Low Countries left them little energy to intervene in France. The death of Bedford at the same time removed the one uniting force on the English side, while the end of the alliance of Burgundy foreshadowed the decline of English dominance in France.

The long truces that marked the war also gave Charles time to reorganise his army and government, replacing his feudal levies with a more modern professional army that could put its superior numbers to good use, and centralising the French state. A repetition of Du Guesclin's battle avoidance strategy paid dividends and the French were able to recover town after town.

By 1449, the French had retaken Rouen. In 1450, the Count of Clermont and Arthur de Richemont, Earl of Richmond, of the Montfort family (the future Arthur III, Duke of Brittany) caught an English army attempting to relieve Caen at the Battle of Formigny and defeated it. The English army was attacked from the flank and rear by Richemont's force just as they were on the verge of beating Clermont's army. The French proceeded to capture Caen on July 6 and Bordeaux and Bayonne in 1451. The attempt by Talbot to retake Guyenne, though initially welcomed by the locals, was crushed by Jean Bureau and his cannons at the Battle of Castillon in 1453 where Talbot had led a small Anglo-Gascon force in a frontal attack on an entrenched camp. This is considered the last battle of the Hundred Years' War.

See also
 Siege of Rouen

References

 
 
1410s conflicts
1420s conflicts
1430s conflicts
1440s conflicts
1450s conflicts
Conflicts of the Hundred Years' War
Joan of Arc
Philip the Good (Duke of Burgundy)
Henry V of England
Henry VI of England